Osiedle Słoneczne  is a settlement in the administrative district of Gmina Chojnice, within Chojnice County, Pomeranian Voivodeship, in northern Poland. It belongs to the sołectwo of Ogorzeliny.

For details on the region's history, see History of Pomerania.

References

Villages in Chojnice County